Insaaf Ki Awaaz is a 1986 Indian Hindi-language action film directed by B. Gopal and produced by D. Rama Naidu under the banner of Suresh Productions. The film stars Rekha, Anil Kapoor, Richa Sharma, Raj Babbar. The music director of the film is Bappi Lahiri. The film was a remake of Telugu film Pratidhwani (1986), directed by B. Gopal.

Cast
Rekha as Inspector Jhansi Rani
Anil Kapoor as Ravi Kumar
Richa Sharma as Renu
Raj Babbar as Chandrashekhar Azaad
Kader Khan as Chaurangilal Domukhiya
Anupam Kher as Kailashnath
Roopesh Kumar as Mahendranath
Gulshan Grover as Vikram Domukhiya
Tej Sapru as Harinath
Shafi Inamdar as Sanyasi Raja
Pallavi Joshi as Jhansi Rani's Daughter
Nilu Phule as Jhansi Rani's Father-in-law
Sushma Seth as Jhansi Rani's Mother-in-law
Asrani as Murli
Jagdeep as Constable Kanhaiya
Parikshit Sahni as Police Commissioner
Mohan Choti as Shankar
Manmohan Krishna as Judge
Surya as Vikram's Friend

Music
The music was composed by Bappi Lahiri, while the lyrics were penned by Indeevar.

Songs

References

External links
 

Indian action films
1980s Hindi-language films
Films directed by B. Gopal
Films scored by Bappi Lahiri
Hindi remakes of Telugu films
1986 action films
1986 films
Suresh Productions films